Nitracaine is a  stimulant  with local anesthetic properties that has been sold online as a designer drug.

It is closely related to dimethocaine.

Legal status 

Sweden's public health agency suggested classifying Nitracaine as a hazardous substance, on September 25, 2019.

See also
 3-(p-Fluorobenzoyloxy)tropane

References 

Benzoate esters
Designer drugs
Local anesthetics
Nitrobenzenes
Stimulants
Diethylamino compounds